Stockport is a small town   north of Adelaide and  south of Tarlee in South Australia. It was laid out on section 1283, Hundred of Light in 1845 by Samuel Stocks junior, naming it for his birthplace, Stockport in Cheshire (now Greater Manchester), England.

On the southern boundary of the Clare & Gilbert Valleys Council area, it was once the heart of a small farming community. Stockport was a stop on the Peterborough railway line which opened past Stockport in 1869, connecting it to Adelaide. The line closed in the 2000s.

Stockport today boasts a number of old stone homes, mixed with a number of new residences.

The Charles Todd Observatory, topped by a 7.5 metre dome, was built at Stockport . It is operated by the Astronomical Society of South Australia. It was closed in 2010 after being damaged in a severe storm, but reopened in 2016.

Glenhaven Park Camp, an adventure park operated by the YMCA, is located off Ayliffe Bridge Road at Stockport.

See also
List of cities and towns in South Australia

References

Towns in South Australia